Nina Bratchikova was the defending champion, but lost in the Quarterfinals to Kathrin Wörle.
Valeria Savinykh defeated Petra Cetkovská in the final, 6–1, 6–3.

Seeds

Draw

Finals

Top half

Bottom half

References
 Main Draw
 Qualifying Draw

Soweto Open - Singles
2011 Women's Singles